John Allan Peterson (born October 22, 1948 in Cumberland, Wisconsin) is an American wrestler and Olympic champion in freestyle wrestling.

Olympics
Peterson competed at the 1972 Summer Olympics in Munich where he received a silver medal in freestyle wrestling in the middleweight class. He won a gold medal at the 1976 Summer Olympics in Montreal, Quebec.

Peterson's brother, Ben Peterson, also competed in both the 1972 and 1976 Summer Olympics, also winning gold (1972) and silver (1976) medals in freestyle wrestling. He grew up in Comstock, Wisconsin, attending nearby Cumberland High School before graduating from the University of Wisconsin-Stout in 1971.

In 1986, Peterson was inducted into the National Wrestling Hall of Fame as a Distinguished Member.

References

External links
 

1948 births
Living people
Wrestlers at the 1972 Summer Olympics
Wrestlers at the 1976 Summer Olympics
American male sport wrestlers
Olympic gold medalists for the United States in wrestling
Olympic silver medalists for the United States in wrestling
Sportspeople from Wisconsin
People from Cumberland, Wisconsin
University of Wisconsin–Stout alumni
World Wrestling Championships medalists
Medalists at the 1976 Summer Olympics
Medalists at the 1972 Summer Olympics